The Old New Synagogue, also called the Altneuschul, situated in Josefov, Prague, is Europe's oldest active synagogue. It is also the oldest surviving medieval synagogue of twin-nave design.

Completed in 1270 in gothic style, it was one of Prague's first gothic buildings. A still older Prague synagogue, known as the Old Synagogue, was demolished in 1867 and replaced by the Spanish Synagogue.

Etymology
The synagogue was originally called the New or Great Synagogue and later, when newer synagogues were built in the 16th century, it became known as the Old-New Synagogue. Another explanation derives the name from the Hebrew עַל תְּנַאי (al tnay), which means "on condition" and sounds identical to the Yiddish "alt-nay," or old-new. According to legend angels have brought stones from the Temple in Jerusalem to build the Synagogue in Prague—"on condition" that they are to be returned, when the Messiah comes, i.e., when the Temple in Jerusalem is rebuilt and the stones are needed.

Interior

Nine steps lead from the street into a vestibule, from which a door opens into a double-nave with six vaulted bays. This double-nave system was most likely adapted from plans of monasteries and chapels by the synagogue's Christian architects. The molding on the tympanum of the synagogue’s entryway has a design that incorporates twelve vines and twelve bunches of grapes, said to represent twelve tribes of Israel. Two large pillars aligned east to west in the middle of the room each support the interior corner of four bays. The bays have two narrow Gothic windows on the sides, for a total of twelve, again representing the twelve tribes. The narrow windows are probably responsible for many older descriptions of the building as being dark; it is now brightly lit with several electric chandeliers.

The vaulting on the six bays has five ribs instead of the typical four or six. It has been suggested that this was an attempt to avoid associations with the Christian cross. Many scholars dispute this theory, pointing to synagogues that have quadripartite ribs, and Christian buildings that have the unusual five rib design.

The bimah from which Torah scrolls are read is located between the two pillars. The base of the bimah repeats the twelve vine motif found on the tympanum. The Aron Kodesh where the Torah scrolls are stored is located in the middle of the customary eastern wall. There are five steps leading up to the Ark and two round stained glass windows on either side above it. A lectern in front of the ark has a square well a few inches below the main floor for the service leader to stand in.

The twelve lancet windows in the synagogue, which directed light towards the bimah, apparently led members to compare the structure with Solomon's Temple.

The synagogue follows orthodox custom, with separate seating for men and women during prayer services. Women sit in an outer room with small windows looking into the main sanctuary. The framework of the roof, the gable, and the party wall date from the Middle Ages.

An unusual feature found in the nave of this synagogue is a large red flag near the west pillar. In the centre of the flag is a Star of David and in the centre of the star is a "Jewish hat." Both the hat and star are stitched in gold. Also stitched in gold is the text of Shema Yisrael. Ferdinand III, Holy Roman Emperor awarded the Jewish community their own banner in recognition for their services in the defence of Prague during the Thirty Years War. The banner now on display is a modern reproduction.

Golem of Prague
It is said that the body of a Golem (created by Rabbi Judah Loew ben Bezalel) lies in the attic where the genizah of Prague's community is kept. A legend is told of a Nazi agent during World War II broaching the genizah, but who perished instead. In the event, the Gestapo apparently did not enter the attic during the war, and the building was spared during the Nazis' destruction of synagogues. The lowest three meters of the stairs leading to the attic from the outside have been removed and the attic is not open to the general public. Renovation in 1883, and exploration of the attic in August 2014, found no trace of a golem.

See also
 Oldest synagogues in the world

Gallery

References

Bibliography
Arno Pařík, Pražské Synagogy/Prague Synagogues, Jewish Museum in Prague, 2000, .

External links

The Old-New Synagogue, Jewish Community of Prague
Altneushul, Prague an architectural description by Carol Herselle Krinsky
The Altneuschul Synagogue – An art historical perspective of the world's oldest functioning synagogue a paper by Olivia Benes accompanying an academic project, Spring 2022 
Altneuschul by Arno Pařík at The YIVO Encyclopedia of Jews in Eastern Europe
Altneuschul in Prague, Czech Republic at The Bezalel Narkiss Index of Jewish Art of the Center for Jewish Art
Altneuschul at edwardvictor.com includes photcards
Prague: The Synagogues by Gotthard Deutsch and Schulim Ochser at The Jewish Encyclopedia

13th-century synagogues
Ashkenazi Jewish culture in the Czech Republic
Ashkenazi synagogues
Golem
Gothic architecture in the Czech Republic
Medieval synagogues
National Cultural Monuments of the Czech Republic
Romanesque and Gothic synagogues
Synagogues in Prague
Josefov (Prague)
Buildings and structures completed in 1270
1270 establishments in Europe